This is a list of Harvard Crimson football players in the NFL Draft.

Key

Selections

References

Harvard

Harvard Crimson in the NFL Draft